Antonio Molina may refer to:

 Antonio Molina (singer) (1928–1992), Spanish flamenco singer and actor
 Antonio Molina (cyclist) (born 1991), Spanish cyclist
 José Antonio Molina Rosito (born 1926), known as Antonio Molina, Honduran botanist and professor
 Antonio Molina (composer) (1894–1980), Filipino composer, conductor and music administrator
 Antonio Vilaplana Molina (1926–2010), Roman Catholic bishop
 Antonio Muñoz Molina (born 1956), Spanish writer
 Antonio de Molina, Spanish Carthusian ascetical writer
 Antonio E. Molina (died 1899), interim mayor of Ponce, Puerto Rico, 1854